Hannelore Possmoser (sometimes shown as Hanns Possmoer) was an Austrian luger who competed during the late 1950s and early 1960s. She won the silver medal in the women's singles at the 1960 FIL World Luge Championships in Garmisch-Partenkirchen, West Germany.

References 
Hickok sports information on World champions in luge and skeleton.
SportQuick.com information on World champions in luge 

Austrian female lugers
Possibly living people
Year of birth missing
20th-century Austrian women